Ana Bertha Espín Ocampo (born 13 October 1958) is a Mexican actress.

Filmography

Awards and nominations

References

External links

1956 births
Living people
Mexican telenovela actresses
Mexican television actresses
Mexican film actresses
20th-century Mexican actresses
21st-century Mexican actresses
Actresses from Morelos